Patrick or Pat Watkins may refer to:

 Patrick Watkins (sailor), Irish sailor, first resident of the Galapagos Islands
 Pat Watkins (baseball) (born 1972), American baseball player  
 Pat Watkins (born 1982), Canadian football player